The Cobweb is a 1996 novel written by Neal Stephenson with J. Frederick George, a pseudonym for Stephenson's uncle, historian George Jewsbury.  It was originally published under the collective pseudonym "Stephen Bury", as was their earlier novel Interface (1994).

The novel is set in the fictional Iowa twin towns of Wapsipinicon-Nishnabotna, named for the Wapsipinicon and Nishnabotna rivers.  In many important respects, this town resembles Ames, Iowa, where Stephenson attended Ames High School.

Plot
When Clyde Banks, an Iowan Deputy with a newborn baby and a wife in the first Gulf War, starts looking into odd events in his town, he discovers a plot involving a new Triangle Trade of terrorists, biological warfare, and training. Mixing the events staged in Washington, D.C. and those happening in the Gulf, a strange thread of deceit appears to be winding its way back to Iowa. Although fictional in its narrative, the story includes appearances by Tariq Aziz and George H. W. Bush.

1996 American novels
Novels by Neal Stephenson
Collaborative novels
Books about George H. W. Bush
Works published under a pseudonym
Novels set in Iowa
Ames, Iowa
Cultural depictions of George H. W. Bush
Bantam Spectra books